Jim "Bull" Martin (20 August 1884 – 12 October 1940) was an Australian rules footballer who played with Carlton, Essendon and Fitzroy in the Victorian Football League (VFL).

Football
Martin played mostly as a forward, often in the pocket. He only made six appearances for Carlton in his debut season and the following year switched to Northcote.

A strongly built and physical player, Martin returned to the league in 1907, with Essendon, playing there for the next seven years. Despite only kicking 16 goals in 1907, it was enough to top the goal-kicking at Essendon. He played in Essendon's losing 1908 Grand Final side.

He missed out on their 1911 premiership when he received a twelve-week suspension mid-season for striking George Holden of Fitzroy. Police later charged Martin with assault, making him the first VFL player to appear before the courts over an on-field incident. 

After playing in Esendon's 1912 premiership team in 1912, he crossed to Fitzroy's during the 1913 season and participated in another premiership. This made him the first person in VFL history to play in consecutive premierships at two clubs, a feat later equaled by only Tom Fitzmaurice.

Death
Jim Martin died in Royal Melbourne Hospital in 1940.

References

External links

Essendon Football Club profile

1884 births
1940 deaths
Australian rules footballers from Melbourne
Australian Rules footballers: place kick exponents
Northcote Football Club players
Carlton Football Club players
Essendon Football Club players
Essendon Football Club Premiership players
Fitzroy Football Club players
Fitzroy Football Club Premiership players
Two-time VFL/AFL Premiership players
People from Carlton, Victoria